Rhomborhina is a genus of large scarab beetles described by Hope in 1837. They are members of the subfamily Cetoniinae. They mostly live in East and South Asia. The name is frequently misspelled as Rhomborrhina following an unjustified change by Hermann Burmeister in 1842.

Species
 Rhomborhina aokii Sakai, 1993
 Rhomborhina bossioni Bourgoin, 1916
 Rhomborhina bousqueti Alexis & Delpart, 1998
 Rhomborhina castanea Sakai, 1997
 Rhomborhina folschveilleri Devecis, 2008
 Rhomborhina formosana Moser, 1909
 Rhomborhina fuscipes Fairmaire, 1893
 Rhomborhina gestroi Moser, 1903
 Rhomborhina gigantea Kraatz, 1883
 Rhomborhina hamai Nomura, 1964
 Rhomborhina hiekei Ruter, 1965
 Rhomborhina kurosawai Matsumoto & Sakai, 1987
 Rhomborhina mellyi (Gory & Percheron, 1833)
 Rhomborhina microcephala Westwood, 1842
 Rhomborhina polita Waterhouse, 1875
 Rhomborhina resplendens (Swartz, 1817)
 Rhomborhina splendida Moser, 1913
 Rhomborhina taiwana Sawada, 1949
 Rhomborhina unicolor Motschulsky, 1861
 Rhomborhina violacea Schürhoff, 1942
 Rhomborhina yunnana Moser, 1907

References

External links 
Rhomborhina resplendens from China
Rhomborhina splendida from Taiwan

Cetoniinae